Störtebeker Braumanufaktur GmbH is a brewery in Stralsund, Germany and is the sole brewery in the city. The company produces beer under the brands "Störtebeker" and "Stralsunder", as well as mineral water and other non-alcoholic beverages. The brewery adopted its present name at the end of 2011; before this, it was known as Stralsunder Brauerei GmbH. The name is a homage to the German pirate Klaus Störtebeker.

History
Störtebeker Braumanufaktur was founded in 1827 as "Stralsunder Vereinsbrauerei" and served the surrounding area, including a number of resorts along the Baltic coast. Due to increasing demand, the brewery constructed a new building along the Greifswalder Chaussee with modern technology, including one of the first mechanical refrigeration units.

After the Second World War, operations continued, and the brewery was reincorporated as a publicly owned Volkseigener Betrieb (VEB). Due to aging technology and the difficulty of acquiring quality raw materials, the quality and profitability of the brewery declined.

Production
In May 2010, the brewery purchased two 120,000 liter tanks for the production of Bernstein-Weizen. In 2016, Störtebeker's most successful year to date, the brewery produced and sold .

References 

Beer brands of Germany
Breweries in Germany
Pages translated from German Wikipedia
German companies established in 1827